Adolf Wissel (19 April 1894 – 17 November 1973) was a German painter.  He was one of the official artists of Nazism.

Wissel, who was born in Velber, was a painter in the genre of Nazi folk art, the idea being that these paintings should show the simple, natural life of a farming family. The phrase 'union with the soil' best describes the subject of his art. Wissel idealised farming life for predominantly urban viewers. Exhibitions of paintings of this genre were meant to show the peasants and working class that they were just as good as the wealthy, and that they too deserved a pleasant life. These paintings were part of the Nazis' 'blood and soil' campaign, designed to associate the ideas of health, family and motherhood with the country. Wissel painted many pictures such as these, but his work contains subtle distortions and accentuations influenced by expressionism.

He died in Velber in 1973.

References

1894 births
1973 deaths
20th-century German painters
20th-century German male artists
German male painters